There were several special elections to the United States House of Representatives in 1937 during the 75th United States Congress.

List of elections 

|-
! 
| James P. Buchanan
| 
| 1913 
|  | Incumbent died February 22, 1937.New member elected April 10, 1937.Democratic hold.
| nowrap | 

|-
! 
| Henry E. Stubbs
| 
| 1932
|  | Incumbent died February 28, 1937.New member elected May 4, 1937.Democratic hold.
| nowrap | 

|-
! 
| Benjamin K. Focht
| 
| 1932
|  | Incumbent died March 27, 1937.New member elected May 11, 1937.Republican hold.
| nowrap | 

|-
! 
| William P. Connery Jr.
| 
| 1922
|  | Incumbent died June 15, 1937.New member elected September 28, 1937.Democratic hold.
| nowrap | 

|-
! 
| Theodore A. Peyser
| 
| 1932
|  | Incumbent died August 8, 1937.New member elected November 2, 1937.Republican gain.
| nowrap | 

|-
! 
| Charles D. Millard
| 
| 1930
|  | Incumbent resigned September 29, 1937 when elected surrogate of Westchester County.New member elected November 2, 1937.Republican hold.
| nowrap | 

|-
! 
| Philip A. Goodwin
| 
| 1932
|  | Incumbent died June 6, 1937.New member elected November 2, 1937.Republican hold.
| nowrap | 

|-
! 
| Andrew J. Montague
| 
| 1934
|  | Incumbent died January 24, 1937.New member elected November 2, 1937.Democratic hold.
| nowrap | 

|-
! 
| Robert P. Hill
| 
| 1936
|  | Incumbent died October 29, 1937.New member elected December 10, 1937.Democratic hold.
| nowrap | 

|-
! 
| John P. Higgins
| 
| 1934
|  | Incumbent resigned September 30, 1937 to become chief justice of the Massachusetts Superior Court.New member elected December 14, 1937.Democratic hold.
| nowrap | 

|}

References 

 
1937